is the name given to the recurring characters in manga created by manga artist Osamu Tezuka. Throughout his career, Tezuka frequently re-used the same characters in different roles across series; for example, the character Shunsaku Ban appears as a detective in Metropolis and as Astro Boy's teacher in Astro Boy. The name alludes to the Hollywood practice of the star system, and can be seen as analogous to film directors who work with the same actors across multiple movies; Tezuka joked about how much his characters were paid, and occasionally based them on famous western actors.

Partial character list

Osamu Tezuka himself

 himself makes frequent appearances, usually just as an in-joke, in nearly all of his works. He can be recognized by his round spotted nose and round glasses and sometimes wears a beret. In the collected Astro Boy volumes, he often introduces stories, and dispenses trivia.

He is a major character in the manga The Vampires. Tezuka went so far as to play the role himself in the 1968 TV adaptation of the series. He also makes frequent appearances in the Black Jack anime, in which, as a doctor, he is a former classmate of Black Jack's.

Higeoyaji 

, or Shunsuke Ban, is a bald, portly, middle-aged man with a large chalk-white moustache. He is an often comical and grumpy yet good-natured. He is 42 years old, as mentioned in one of the manga. His facial hair earns him the nickname . In the 1960s English version of the animated Astro Boy, his name was private detective Edgar Pompous, then Percival Pompous.  Perhaps because his character was appearing in another animated series based on Tezuka's manga at the time, in the 1980s English animated Astro Boy changed his name to Albert Duncan, and he was given the nickname "Daddy Walrus".  His typical role is that of a detective in other Tezuka materials, with sometimes a nephew/assistant named Ken'ichi ("Ken" or "Kennedy" in English versions of the Astro Boy TV series). The 1980s color remake (as well as the original manga) had him appear as Astro Boy's teacher, then as a detective. In the 2003 Astro Boy redeux, he is called Wally Kisaragi, and in the English-language manga, his "Higeoyaji" nickname is translated as "Mustachio".  He is featured as either a regular character or a guest star in any of a number of Tezuka works. Shunsaku Ban is often cast as some sort of adventurer, usually an amateur or professional private investigator. His trademark characteristic is to confront danger with a comical wild-eyed panic, then after a moment recapture his composure and vigorously attack the threat.

Ham Egg 
 

, also known as Cachatore, Hammond Eggs, Hamegg, or Simon Sakely (in Jungle Emperor Leo) he is a villain with a round head, a thin moustache, a wide grin, curly hair and sometimes a top hat. His name is an obvious play on the words "ham and eggs".

Primarily known for being a cruel circus manager in Astro Boy. He also was a hotel manager and an organ smuggler in Phoenix. He made other appearances in Astro Boy (such as a gangster or a murderous surgeon). In Kimba the White Lion, he portrays the hunter who kills Kimba's father, Panja, and holds him captive during his infancy.

Rock 

 is a young "bad boy" with shiny dark hair, sometimes wearing sunglasses. He mostly plays villains, after having played juvenile heroes. He made his first appearance in Rock Holmes, as a child detective. He appeared with Astro Boy several times. He was in Phoenix. He also starred in animated Osamu Tezuka's Metropolis as Duke Red's brutal son. In the Astro Boy: Omega Factor video game he is initially the real identity of the villain, Deadcross, but falls in love with - and is reformed by - Princess Sapphire, and remains with her in the distant past to help her try to avert the demise of the continent of Mu, similar to what happened in the Marine Express movie.

Leo 

 is a courageous, vegetarian white lion with black tips on his ears.  Often known as "Kimba" in English-language translations, after he was given that name in Kimba the White Lion, the English dub of his 1960s anime series. In both his manga and anime series, he is known as Jungle Emperor Leo and acts as an ambassador toward the human world for animals. In Astro Boy: Omega Factor an android boy known as Pook disguises himself as Leo to steal jewels.

Astro Boy 

 is a principal "actor". He is shown in the famous manga and assorted versions of the anime as a child robot, usually wearing shorts (which are actually part of his body), identified by his trademark, two pointy "cowlicks" on the front and back of his head. In the manga, his good nature and incorruptible heart, combined with an array of powers, put him on a quest to protect robots and humans from villainous conquerors and alien invaders. He made other appearances in other manga including Black Jack's, in which he plays a major role in at least one story (Volume 22 of the English manga release by Dark Horse of Astro Boy) and in the anime Undersea Super Train: Marine Express, in which he is called "Adam". Astro resembles the wooden boy Pinocchio.

Sapphire 

 is, and was, a young woman with slightly curly dark hair, who first starred in Princess Knight. She was the queen of the Mu civilization in the animated movie Marine Express and in the Astro Boy: Omega Factor game.

Phoenix 

 is an immortal alien entity that takes the physical form of a legendary magical mythological bird.

Skunk Kusai 

 is a pale, blonde smirking man with a short brown nose, sleepy eyes, and sometimes a gray complexion (which is made clear in the 1980 Astro Boy anime.) He usually plays a villain. His full name is often displayed as Skunk Kusai (Kusai means "stinky", "fishy" in Japanese). Primarily known for being a gangster enemy to Astro Boy. He first appeared in Metropolis as an overly ambitious military officer.

Garon 

 is a giant robot sent by aliens as a test for Earth's inhabitants. His original comic, Majin Garon, ran in Boukenoh from July 1959 until July 1962. He is the final boss of the video game Astro Boy: Omega Factor and the secret treasure of Mu.

Black Jack 

 is a cold-natured, eerie, yet kindhearted and ingenious surgeon is one of Tezuka's dearest creations, despite the fact that in the present day he receives very little credit compared to his rival Astro Boy. Black Jack is, according to Tezuka, his alter ego. Black Jack refuses to get a medical license, due to the corruption within medicine practices, and may run into the legal forces while doing operations.  (In the 2006 TV anime Black Jack finally gets his license). Despite his outlaw status, he is considered a miracle worker with his incomparable surgical technique and power of diagnostic analysis. His operations are generally over 10 million yen, but he more frequently helps the unfortunate for free or a token payment. He is sometimes accompanied by his short-tempered adopted daughter/assistant, Pinoko and can be recognized by a large cape, loose trench coat, and blue, black or red string tie (depending on the media) with black and white hair, dark eyes, and a graft of dark skin across the upper left of his face. Having learned wit playing with darts as a boy, is a skilled marksman as well as well-trained in martial arts. A statue of Black Jack stands in the Osamu Tezuka Museum beneath a skylight.

Hosuke Sharaku 

 is a baby-faced young boy with a large head, often sporting a bandage. His main role was in The Three-Eyed One where he is a three-eyed child with evil powers. He has featured in Astro Boy-related media, appearing as the main antagonist in the game Astro Boy: Omega Factor and as a supporting character in the PlayStation 2 game Astro Boy. He was Assaji the apprentice monk in Buddha, still with his bandage. He appeared in the Black Jack anime, also with his bandage. Sharaku's third eye is hidden by the bandage, which suppresses both his power and evil nature.

Unico 

 is a baby unicorn born with a special gift of making anyone happy.

Don Dracula 

 is a comical vampire who moved from Transylvania to Japan and has a very hard time adjusting to the new place. In the animated movie Marine Express and video game Astro Boy: Omega Factor, Don Dracula is a villain who works for Sharaku.

Others
 Acetylene Lamp: Also known as Drake (or Torch in the second series). A tall, middle-aged man with a thin nose, large forehead, wide frowny eyes and often a small mustache with big glasses. He has a "notch" on the back of his head. A running gag throughout Tezuka's work show that a lit candle will stand upright if placed in the notch. Tezuka based the character on a classmate. He appeared regularly in Astro Boy and in Tezuka's Adolf, Black Jack  and in Phoenix. He was the president's secretary in Osamu Tezuka's Metropolis in which the candle appears on his head when he is shot. The candle is a plot point in the game Astro Boy: Omega Factor where his daughter proves its her by remembering that. He also appeared in Bagi, the Monster of Mighty Nature, and cameos in Jungle Emperor Leo.
 Afill
 The Amazing 3: A team of three galactic patrollers named Bokko, Pukko and Nokko. They came to Earth to research and destroy it if necessary. They appeared in Weekly Shōnen Sunday from May 1965 to May 1966.
 Ambassador Magma: A giant humanoid who can transform into a rocket ship. With this series, Tezuka pioneered the "transformers" concept. 
 Atlas: A robot created by Dr. Ram, an Incan scientist who hates civilization, to get revenge on a Mexican village. However, Atlas turns against his creator and leaves him to be burned by the flowing lava caused by an artificial volcanic eruption, but Astro manages to defeat Atlas. He has been reworked in many adaptations which turned him into Astro's half-brother, Skunk's creation, or even Prime Rose's girlfriend.
 Baron Nylon
 Big X: This name actually belongs to the chemical he takes, his real name is Akira Asagumo. The chemical gives him powers that makes him grow bigger. He appeared in Shōnen Bool from 1963 to 1966.
 Biwamaru: A tall, thin bald man; he is completely blind and his eyes are white. His left eye is larger than his right. In Dororo, he is a traveling monk who crosses paths with Hyakkimaru from time to time. In Black Jack, he is a wandering acupuncturist and a rival to Black Jack. He also appears as the Buddhist Priest Tenran in Duke Goblin.
 Bukk Buku
 Butamo Makeru
 Chikara Aritake
 Chiyoko Wato: A classmate of Sharaku who plays as his best friend, mother figure, and even love interest. 
 Deadcross, Lord: Inventor of the first robot president, Rag. He turned into a villain after Rag decided to run against him in the election in Guravia and won. In Astro Boy: Omega Factor, Deadcross is combined with Rock and the leader of the Black Looks while Rag is combined with the Blue Knight.
 Doctor Fooler
 Duke Duralumin
 Duke Red: A tall man with a large, hooked nose and spiky hair on the back of his head. He first appeared in Osamu Tezuka's Metropolis, a name he took back in the game Astro Boy: Omega Factor. He also played the title role in Osamu Tezuka's rendition of Cyrano de Bergerac and Prince Siddartha's doctor in Buddha. He made a few appearances in the Astro Boy manga (such as a mad scientist or a murdered priest) and other Tezuka productions, sometimes under the name Akai ("Red" in Japanese). He appeared in the 2003 Astro Boy TV series, in which he started a war against robots after thinking his robot servant hurt his daughter.
 Frankenstein
 Fumoon: Her real name is "Rococo", she is a mutant created to help evacuate animals from Earth to get away from a toxic cloud.
 Hanamaru, Doctor
 Heck, Ben
 Hecate: The daughter of Satan and rival then ally of Princess Sapphire.
 Higedaruma
 Hyakkimaru
 Hyoutan-tsugi, also known as Gourdski, is a gag character, a small pig-faced patchworked gourd creature that puffs out smoke. Tezuka sometimes even making a character's face looking like it. It appears in almost all of his works, even in the 2009 CGI animated movie where he appears on a billboard. Some fans call it the real star of Tezuka's series.
 Jetter Mars: A remake of Astro Boy, he is more human even having the ability to grow.
 Kao, Sekken
 Kin, Sankaku: Translated as Golden triangle is the leader of the fictitious Chinese criminal organization based on the Triads. He has an ovoid head, fat lips, sunglasses, and one long hair. In an Astro Boy compilation, Tezuka explains that Kin was based on the local watchmaker's son from his childhood.
 Kutter
 Maria
 Marukubi, Boon: A bulky man who usually plays the role of a villain and/or politician.
 Mason
 Melmo:  Most frequently seen as various characters in the Black Jack manga of the 1970s.  Melmo appears either as a 9-year-old or a 19-year-old. Although in her own series both versions of Melmo are the same person, she has sometimes appeared as a mother and a daughter.
 Mitchy: A young, beautiful woman who portrayed the tragic android of the same name in Metropolis, she appeared as 'Tima' in the 2001 film adaptation of the manga. She was also recognized among fans as Astro's android mother in the original 1950s-1960s run of the Astro Boy manga.
 Tima: A young and beautiful woman who died tragically, and was remade with human organs into android, she seem to be the daughter of Duke Red. Tima appears in the 2001 film version of Metropolis.
 Monsieur Ampere
 Norse, Necktall
 Notaarin: Also known as Notarlin, an older, portly character with a round head, sometimes depicted with a moustache and a single hair on the back of his head. He appears as the Superintendent of Police in Osamu Tezuka's Metropolis, also as the Atomic Energy Chairman in the manga version of Nextworld.
 Ochanomizu, Professor: Mentor of Mighty Atom; often seen in Black Jack in positions of authority (councilman, company president, etcetera).
 Omotanium: Not a character per se, but a fictional "substance" à la kryptonite. It has different properties and performs different functions from story to story, such as destroying the brain system of a robot.
 Pick: A young boy who fell to Earth in a meteorite. Garon fell to Earth as well, Pick is actually his heart/conscience, without him he is a soulless monster. Pick is commonly depicted with a "W" on his forehead and wearing overalls. He has appeared in both the Astro Boy and Black Jack manga, sometimes even without Garon. In Astro Boy: Omega Factor, Pick is given the alias and characteristics of Pook a recurring character from Astro Boy.
 Pinoko: The loyal assistant and adopted daughter of Dr. Black Jack.
 Pippy
 Police Inspector Geta
 Police Inspector Tawashi: A police detective with a distrust of robots and therefore has a feud with both Professor Ochanomizu and Shunsuke Ban. While arrogant and even rude, he eventually comes to respect Astro's courage and abilities, even calling for his assistance in particularly difficult cases. Often partnered with Chief Nakamura.
 Prime Rose: A girl with bushy red hair. She originally appeared as a black-clad warrior in black in Prime Rose, comic series in Weekly Shōnen Champion, which was made into an animated movie in 1983. In Astro Boy: Omega Factor, she is Lamp's daughter.
 Rainbow Parakeet: A tall young man with bobbed blue hair, red-tinted sunglasses, a white coat and ascot, and dark pants and gloves. He stars as the title character in his own manga as a thief (à la Lupin III), and as the English cyborg private detective Sherlock Homespun (sometimes written Sherlock Holmespan) in the 1980 Astro Boy anime and Game Boy Advance game Astro Boy: Omega Factor.  In the 2003 Astro Boy series he appears as a terrorist named Kato, who has no concrete goal, but regards his terrorism as art.
 Riiko
 Rommel
 Saboten, Sam: A young man who replaced Rock in a series known as Saboten-Kun, mimicking the Hollywood practice of replacing actors during a series of films.
 Saruta: A stocky man with a huge roundish nose. He appeared as all the Saruta descendants (including Gao) in the Phoenix saga and made some appearances in Buddha. In anime Black Jack TV, he appears like Jontaro Honma, the man who reconstructed the body of Black Jack after his accident when he was a kid. He looks somewhat similar to Professor Ochanomizu because he typically has a large, bulbous nose, but he is not the same character.
 Sasaki, Kojiro: Based on and named after the Japanese swordsman, he is known for his energy, quick temper, and sword skills. Although his first appearance was in Benkei, his break-out role was in Ah, We Three. He also appeared in Black Jack,  he has appeared in The Crater, Rainbow Parakeet, Lion Books, and the animated movie, Marine Express.
 Saturn: A massive, brutal man with a big chin and a pointy moustache, he appeared as the King of Evil in Magic House and he fought Astro Boy as the robot called Satan.
 Shikishima, Kenichi: Also called 'Ken' or 'Kennedy'. Is the nephew/assistant of Ban, Shunsaku and seems to have a crush on Tima.
 Shumari
 Songoku
 Spider: A gag character, he is a very cartoonish and very short man in a black robe, long nose, one hair, stretching an arm and often bouncing. His catchphrase is "Here ta meet ya!" and he ends almost every sentence by "Ayup!" He vaguely resembles Kilroy.
 Doctor Tenma: A man whose face and hair resemble that of a rooster. He played the role of Astro's father and creator. He later appeared in a number of other manga including Black Jack.
 Tick & Tuck
 Tonanshipei
 Zephyrus

See also
List of Osamu Tezuka anime
List of Osamu Tezuka manga

References

Notes
Part of the Osamu Tezuka Star System with other Tezuka characters is listed and described in the Astro Boy: Omega Factor'' game, as the "Omega Factor": it is a memory data which raises Astro Boy's power as it levels up. To increase it, Astro has to make full acquaintance of characters throughout the game. This also unlocks biographies of the characters.

External links
Tezuka in English main page on the Osamu Tezuka Star System 
 Official Tezuka Japan site Characters page

Crossover anime and manga
Japanese mascots